Ramal de Tomar is a Portuguese railway line which connects the stations of Lamarosa, on the Linha do Norte, and Tomar. It was opened on 24 September 1928.

See also 
 List of railway lines in Portugal
 History of rail transport in Portugal

References

Sources

Railway lines in Portugal
Iberian gauge railways
Railway lines opened in 1928